Tyrone Barry Brown (born January 3, 1973) is a former American and Canadian football wide receiver in the National Football League (NFL), Canadian Football League (CFL) and Arena Football League (AFL). He played college football at Toledo. Brown played for the Atlanta Falcons of the NFL, Toronto Argonauts of the CFL and Indiana Firebirds of the AFL.

References

1973 births
Living people
Players of Canadian football from Cincinnati
Players of American football from Cincinnati
American football wide receivers
Canadian football wide receivers
Toledo Rockets football players
Atlanta Falcons players
Toronto Argonauts players
Indiana Firebirds players